The WA Media Awards are presented annually by the Western Australian Journalists Association.

The awards recognise outstanding work by Western Australian reporters, photographers, graphic designers, cartoonists, sub-editors, television camera people and other media workers.

The awards are generally judged by senior media workers, as well as academics, former media workers, judges, businesspeople and others. The qualifying period is usually the 12 months from the beginning of September to the end of August. The 2012 awards were presented at the Hyatt Regency Hotel on 3 November 2012 by Craig Smart from Channel 10 and Emmy Kubainski from Channel 7. The 2012 awards were hosted by The West Australian media workers Kate Ferguson and Daniel Hatch. The 2011 awards were presented by Matt Tinney and Narelda Jacobs at the Pan Pacific Hotel in Perth on 5 November 2011.

The most prestigious individual awards are the Daily News Centenary Prize (informally known as the Gold Award or the WA Journalist of the Year), which, like the Gold Walkley, is presented to the stand-out winner of all the awards; the Arthur Lovekin Prize in Journalism; and the Clarion Prize, which is awarded for outstanding achievement by a member of the Australian Journalists Section of the WA Branch of the MEAA.

Journalists to have been highly successful have been Steve Pennells (19 awards), Sean Cowan (14), Gary Adshead (14), Paige Taylor (13), John Flint (11), Colleen Egan (9), and Joe Spagnolo (7). Pennells, Egan and Flint have also won Walkley Awards.

Adshead and Cowan have each won three WA Journalist of the Year awards, though two of those were shared, while Egan and Victoria Laurie have each won two, one of which was shared.

Awards for 2010

Print Medium
Print News Prize ($500)
Awarded for the best news story or series of news stories published in a newspaper or periodical.
Print Graphics Prize ($500)
Awarded for the best illustration, cartoon or graphic in print.
News Photography Prize ($500)
Awarded for the best news photograph.
Feature Photography Prize ($500)
Awarded for best feature photograph or series (3 or less) on the same subject.
Sub-Editing Prize ($500)
Awarded for the best three headlines written by a sub-editor in newspaper or periodical.
Country Prize ($500)
Awarded for the three best news stories or features published in a country newspaper that appears at least once a week and which circulates outside a 70 km radius of central Perth. This category includes all country papers, but not specialist rural publications such as the Countryman or Farm Weekly.
Suburban Prize ($500)
Awarded for the three best news stories or published in a Perth suburban newspaper that appears at least once a week and which circulates within a 70 km radius of Perth.
Television:
TV Prize ($500)
Awarded for the best news story or series of news stories broadcast on television.
Broadcast Graphics Prize ($500)
Awarded for the best illustration, cartoon or graphic in electronic media.
TV Camera Prize ($500)
Awarded for the best camera work in news, current affairs or sport coverage.
Radio:
Radio Prize ($500)
Awarded for the best news story or series of news stories broadcast on radio.
All media:
Consumer Affairs Prize ($500)
Awarded for the best consumer affairs reporting in any medium.
 Best Columnist Prize ($500)
In memory of columnist Matt Price
Political Reporting Prize ($500)
Awarded for the best political reporting in any medium.
Feature Prize
Awarded for best feature story in any medium. The award honours the memory of feature writer Hugh Schmitt. The award includes radio and TV feature stories and documentaries.
Health and Medical Feature Prize ($500)
Awarded for the best feature story that raises awareness of health-related issues and promotes health or wellbeing.
Resources Prize ($500)
Awarded for the best resources story in any medium.
Health and Medical News Prize ($500)
Awarded for the best health and medical news story in any medium.
Business News Prize ($500)
Awarded for the best business, economics or finance story in any medium.
Sports Prize ($500)
Awarded for the best sports story in any medium. This prize honours the memory of Doug Gilmour, former sports editor, and Geoff Christian, sportswriter and broadcaster.
Environment Prize ($500)
Best Newcomer Prize ($500)
Open to cadets and journalists in their first full year of grading. Entrants to submit their three best pieces of work, showing a range of skills and style. This prize honours the memory of AJA members Jack Eaves, Selwyn Prior and Merv Day who took a great interest in the training and development of young journalists.
Student Prize ($500)
Open to all full-time undergraduate and postgraduate journalism students enrolled at a West Australian tertiary institution and not employed as journalists. Entrants to submit up to three pieces of their best work, showing a range of skills and styles.
Student Prize ($500)
Open to all full-time undergraduate and postgraduate journalism students enrolled at a West Australian tertiary institution and not employed as journalists. Entrants to submit up to three pieces of their best work, showing a range of skills and styles.
A.H. Kornweibel Arts Prize ($500)
Awarded for the best culture and arts story in any medium. The award honours the memory of Albert H C Kornweibel, who was famed throughout Australia for his music critiques as Fidelio, and his work as a reviewer of books, dance and drama.
 Online Reporting Prize ($500)
Awarded for the best news story or series of news stories on the Internet that maximise the use of the online medium.
Other
Clarion Award
This award goes to a member who has, in the opinion of the AJA section, made the greatest contribution to the profession in WA during the year. The committee considers the quality of work and other ways in which the member has contributed to journalism and the Alliance.

1987 winners
 Centenary Prize: Martin Saxon, Sydney Morning Herald
 PPC Prize: Mark Thornton, The West Australian.
 PPC Suburban: Cathy Munro, Post Newspapers
 Radio: Guy Houston, ABC
 Sports/Gilmour: Robert Messenger, Daily News
 Eaves (best cadet): too few entries
 Beck prize for government reporting: too few entries
 TV Prize: too few entries
 Clarion Prize: Robert Millhouse

1988 winners
 Daily News Centenary Prize: Vicki Laurie, ABC TV's 7.30 Report
 Print Prize: Martin Saxon, Daily News
 TV Prize: Vicki Laurie, ABC TV's 7.30 Report Television Journalism Prize
 Beck Prize: Alan Atkinson, ABC TV's 7.30 Report
 Gilmour Prize: John McGrath, The West Australian
 Eaves-Prior Prize: Mara Pritchard, The West Australian
 PPC Prize: Alan Atkinson, ABC TV's 7.30 Report 
 PPC Country: Anne Osbourne, Sound Telegraph
 Lovekin Prize: Martin Saxon
 Clarion Prize: Bob Duffield

1989 winners
 TV Prize: Alison Fan, Channel 7
 Radio Prize: Katy Cronin, ABC
 Print Prize: Cyril Ayris, The West Australian
 Eaves Prior: Jody Lennon, Post Newspapers
 Beck Prize: Alan Atkinson, ABC
 Gilmour Prize: Robbie Burns, Daily News
 Daily News Centenary Prize: Alison Fan, Channel 7
 Lovekin Prize: Robyn Cash.
 PPC Prize: Cyril Ayris
 PPC Country: Phil Clayton, Geraldton Guardian
 PPC Suburban: Maureen Eppen, Sound Telegraph
 Clarion: Jenni Garrigan, The Sunday Times

1990 winners
 TV Prize: Rex Haw, Channel 9
 TV Camera Prize: Not awarded
 Radio Prize: Not awarded
 Print Prize: Cyril Ayris and Steven Loxley, The West Australian
 Photographic Prize: Ross Swanborough, Daily News
 Art Prize: Don Lindsay, The West Australian
 Eaves Prior: Jos Valdman, The West Australian 
 Beck Prize: Steven Loxley
 Gilmour Prize: Kim Hagdorn
 Daily News Centenary Prize: Cyril Ayris and Steven Loxley, The West Australian
 Lovekin Prize: Cyril Ayris.
 PPC Prize: Duncan Graham, freelance
 PPC Country: Patricia Fraser, Great Southern Herald
 PPC Suburban: Wendy Evans, Canning-Melville Times
 Clarion: Jim Magnus

1991 winners
 Beck Prize for government reporting: Martin Saxon
 Best news photograph: Neil Eliot
 Best print report: John McGlue
 Best radio report: Andrew Porter
 Best news item by a cadet: Wendy Pryer
 Arts Prize: Victoria Laurie
 Daily News Centenary Prize: John McGlue
 PPC Prize: Martin Saxon
 PPC Suburban: George Williams
 Lovekin Award: Mike van Niekirk
 Clarion Prize: Anne Merkel

1992 winners

 TV Prize: Not awarded
 TV Camera Prize: Not awarded
 Radio Prize: Not awarded
 Print Prize: Martin Saxon, The Sunday Times
 Best News Picture: Mirek Zabiello, Community Newspaper Group
 Graphics Award: Dean Alston, The West Australian
 Feature Prize: Duncan Graham, The West Australian
 Premier's Art Prize: Victoria Laurie, The Bulletin.
 Eaves Prior Prize: Michael Casey, The West Australian 
 Beck Prize: Brendan Nicholson, The West Australian
 Gilmour Prize: Ken Casellas, The West Australian
 Daily News Centenary Prize: Brendan Nicholson, The West Australian
 Lovekin Prize: Mark Thornton, The West Australian
 PPC Prize: Margot Lang, The West Australian
 PPC Country: Patricia Fraser, Great Southern Herald
 PPC Suburban: Kaye Hawley, Comment News
 Clarion Prize: Mark Thornton

1993 winners
 Best Newcomer Prize: Roger Martin, The West Australian
 Clarion Award: Michael Sinclair-Jones, The West Australian
 Daily News Centenary Prize: Frazer Guild, The Sunday Times
 Feature Prize: Victoria Laurie, freelance
 Photographic Prize: Stephen Ferrier, The West Australian
 Print News Prize: Frazer Guild, The Sunday Times
 Sports Prize: Paul Haynes, Albany Advertiser
 TV Camera Prize: Alan Griffiths, GWN
 Arthur Lovekin Prize in Journalism: Brendan Nicholson, The West Australian

1994 winners
 Best Newcomer Prize: Alva McNicol, Post Newspapers
 Clarion Award: Tony Ashby, The West Australian
 Daily News Centenary Prize: Carole Kerr and team, Channel 9
 Feature Prize: Tom Salom, The West Australian
 Photographic Prize: Tony Ashby, The West Australian
 Print News Prize: Judy Hughes, AAP
 Sports Prize: Steve Butler, South Western Times
 TV Camera Prize: Barry Dux, Channel 9
 TV Prize: Carole Kerr and team, Channel 9
 Arthur Lovekin Prize in Journalism: Marnie McKimmie, The West Australian

1995 winners
 Best Newcomer Prize: Peter Klinger, Kalgoorlie Miner
 Clarion Award: Peter Kennedy, ABC
 Daily News Centenary Prize: Luke Morfesse, The West Australian
 Feature Prize: Tony Barrass, The West Australian
 Print Graphics Prize: Gus Boyd, The West Australian
 Photographic Prize: Nic Ellis, The West Australian
 Print News Prize: Luke Morfesse, The West Australian
 Radio Prize: Liz Byrski, ABC Radio
 Sports Prize: Jim Gill, ABC Radio
 TV Camera Prize: Steve Bycroft, Channel 9
 TV Prize: Geof Parry, Channel 9
 Arthur Lovekin Prize in Journalism: Margot Lang, The West Australian
 Perth Press Club Prize: Cyril Ayris, The West Australian

1996 winners
 Best Newcomer Prize: Paul Kadak, Channel 9
 Clarion Award: David Cusworth, The West Australian
 Daily News Centenary Prize: Ron D'Raine, The West Australian
 Feature Prize: Victoria Laurie, freelance
 Print Graphics Prize: Don Lindsay, The West Australian
 Photographic Prize: Ron D'Raine, The West Australian
 Print News Prize: Luke Morfesse, The West Australian
 Radio Prize: Adrienne Lowth, ABC Radio
 Sports Prize: David Marsh, The West Australian
 TV Camera Prize: Stephen Bright, Channel 9
 TV Prize: Carole Kerr, Channel 9
 Arthur Lovekin Prize in Journalism: Vanessa Gould, The West Australian
 Perth Press Club Country Prize: Jay Townsend, Kalgoorlie Miner
 Perth Press Club Suburban Prize: Hillary Arber, Community Newspaper Group
 Perth Press Club Prize: Ann Treweek, The Sunday Times

1997 winners
 Best Newcomer Prize: Tracey Searle, Westside Sport
 Clarion Award: Chris Smyth, Alliance Secretary
 Daily News Centenary Prize: Gary Adshead, Channel 9
 Feature Prize: Colleen Egan, freelance
 Print Graphics Prize: Dean Alston, The West Australian
 Photographic Prize: Tony Ashby, The West Australian
 Print News Prize: Luke Morfesse, The West Australian
 Radio Prize: John McNamara, ABC Radio
 Sports Prize: Dave Hughes, The West Australian
 Sub-editing Prize: David Cusworth, The West Australian
 TV Camera Prize: Steve Bycroft, freelance
 TV Prize: Gary Adshead, Channel 9
 Arthur Lovekin Prize in Journalism: Michael Day, The West Australian
 Perth Press Club Country Prize: Gabrielle Adams, Augusta-Margaret River Mail
 Perth Press Club Suburban Prize: Linda Callaghan, Post Newspapers
 Perth Press Club Prize: Margot Lang, The West Australian

1998 winners
 Best Newcomer Prize: Joanna Ball ABC and Natasha Harradine Mid West Times
 Clarion Award: George Williams, Post Newspapers
 Daily News Centenary Prize: Mairi Barton, The West Australian
 Feature Prize: Anne Burns, The West Australian
 Print Graphics Prize: Dean Alston, The West Australian
 Photographic Prize: Tony McDonough, freelance
 Print News Prize: Mairi Barton, The West Australian
 Sports Prize: Gary Stocks, The West Australian
 Sub-editing Prize: Robert Hunt, The West Australian
 TV Camera Prize: Steve Bycroft, freelance
 TV Prize: Graeme Butler, Channel 10
 Arthur Lovekin Prize in Journalism: Norm Aisbett, The West Australian
 Perth Press Club Country Prize: Sally Cox and Maria Ligerakis, Mandurah Mail
 Perth Press Club Suburban Prize: George Williams, Post Newspapers
 Perth Press Club Prize: Michael Day, The West Australian

1999 winners
 Best Newcomer Prize: Michael Tetlow, GWN
 Clarion Award: Estelle Blackburn, Freelance
 Daily News Centenary Prize: Robert Duncan, The West Australian
 Feature Prize: Victoria Laurie, freelance
 Print Graphics Prize: Dean Alston, The West Australian
 Photographic Prize: Robert Duncan, The West Australian
 Print News Prize: Gay McNamara, The West Australian
 Radio Prize: Liam Bartlett, ABC 720
 Sports Prize: Bevan Eakins, The West Australian
 Sub-editing Prize: James Henderson, The Sunday Times
 TV Camera Prize: Wayne Waller, Channel 9
 TV Prize: Graeme Butler, Channel 7
 Arthur Lovekin Prize in Journalism: Bevan Eakins, The West Australian
 Perth Press Club Country Prize: Melanie Van Helvort, South Western Times
 Perth Press Club Suburban Prize: Martin Turner, Community Newspaper Group
 Perth Press Club Prize: Estelle Blackburn, Freelance

2000 winners
 Best Newcomer Prize: Nicolette Casella, The Sunday Times, and Alison Carter, ABC TV
 Business Prize: Mark Drummond, AFR
 Clarion Award: Bev East, Branch Assistant Secretary
 Daily News Centenary Prize: Torrance Mendez, The West Australian
 Feature Prize: Liam Bartlett, ABC 720
 Print Graphics Prize: Sean Leahy, The Sunday Times
 Photographic Prize: Nic Ellis, The West Australian
 Print News Prize: Torrance Mendez, The West Australian
 Radio Prize: Peter Kennedy, ABC Radio
 Sports Prize: Matt Price, The Australian
 Sub-editing Prize: David Cusworth, The West Australian
 TV Camera Prize: Darren Speedie, Channel 9
 TV Prize: Simon Dowding, Channel 7
 Arthur Lovekin Prize in Journalism: Kim Macdonald, The Sunday Times
 Perth Press Club Country Prize: Robert Newton, Augusta-Margaret River Mail
 Perth Press Club Suburban Prize: Kerry Faulkner, Post Newspapers
 Perth Press Club Prize: Tony Ashby, The West Australian

2001 winners
 Best Newcomer Prize: Grant Taylor, Kalgoorlie Miner
 Broadcast Graphics Prize: Kym Cohen, ABC TV
 Business Prize: Mark Drummond, AFR
 Clarion Award: Martin Saxon, The Sunday Times
 Daily News Centenary Prize: Chris Johnston, Geraldton Guardian
 Feature Prize: Victoria Laurie, The Australian
 Print Graphics Prize: Dean Alston, The West Australian
 Photographic Prize: Michael O'Brien, The West Australian
 Print News Prize: Chris Johnston, Geraldton Guardian
 Radio Prize: Liam Bartlett, ABC 720
 Sports Prize: Gary Adshead, The Sunday Times
 Sub-editing Prize: David Turnock, WA Business News
 TV Camera Prize: Tim Cohen, Channel 7
 TV Prize: Paul Kadak, Channel 7
 Arthur Lovekin Prize in Journalism: John Flint, The Sunday Times
 Perth Press Club Country Prize: Chris Johnston, Geraldton Guardian
 Perth Press Club Suburban Prize: Fiona Adolph, Perth Weekly
 Perth Press Club Prize: Carmelo Amalfi, The West Australian

2002 winners
 Best Newcomer Prize: Luke Eliot, Kalgoorlie Miner
 Broadcast Graphics Prize: Kym Cohen, ABC TV
 Business Prize: Peter Klinger, AFR
 Clarion Award: Kate Malkovic
 Daily News Centenary Prize: Victoria Laurie & Colleen Egan, The Australian
 Feature Prize: Victoria Laurie & Colleen Egan, The Australian
 Print Graphics Prize: Colin Poad, The West Australian
 Photographic Prize: Barry Baker, The West Australian
 Print News Prize: John Flint & Kim Macdonald, The Sunday Times
 Radio Prize: Liam Bartlett, ABC 720
 Sports Prize: John Flint, The Sunday Times
 Sub-editing Prize: Lloyd Jones, The Sunday Times
 TV Camera Prize: Trent Nind, Channel 9
 TV Prize: Paula Hudson, Channel 9
 Arthur Lovekin Prize in Journalism: Victoria Laurie & Colleen Egan, The Australian
 Perth Press Club Country Prize: Liam Phillips, Kalgoorlie Miner
 Perth Press Club Suburban Prize: Paige Taylor, Post Newspapers
 Perth Press Club Prize: Natalie O'Brien, The Australian

2003 winners
 Health and Medical Prize: Joe Spagnolo, South Western Times
 Resources Prize: Steve Pennells, The West Australian
 Feature Photography: Frances Andrijich, The Weekend Australian Magazine
 News Photography: Alf Sorbello, freelance
 Travel Report: Steven Scourfield, The West Australian
 Print News: John Flint, The Sunday Times
 Print Graphics: Rachel Coad/Alison Wakeham/Steve Penn, The West Australian
 Sub-editing Prize: David Cusworth, The West Australian
 TV Prize: Mark Readings, Channel 9
 Broadcast Graphics Prize: Kym Cohen, ABC TV
 TV Camera Prize: Barry Dux, Channel 9
 Feature Prize: David de Vos and colleagues, ABC TV
 Business News Prize: Sean Cowan, The West Australian
 Sports Prize: Nick Taylor, The Sunday Times
 Best Newcomer: Sophie McNeill, SBS Dateline
 Student Prize: Jessica Vanderende, Curtin University
 Centenary Prize: Mark Readings, Channel 9
 Perth Press Club Awards:
 Country Prize: Mark Hooper, Esperance Express
 Post Newspapers Suburban Newspaper Award: Bethany Hiatt, Community Newspapers
 Perth Press Club Prize: Colleen Egan, The Australian
 Clarion Prize: Malcolm Hollingsworth

2004 winners
 Best Newcomer: Megan Sadler, The Kalgoorlie Miner
 Business News: Sean Cowan and Philip Cornford, The West Australian
 Community Safety Reporting: Joe Spagnolo, South West Times
 Sports Prize: David Marsh, The West Australian
 Broadcast Graphics: Kym Cohen, ABC TV.
 TV Camera Prize: Wayne Waller, Channel 9
 TV Prize: Paula Hudson, Channel 9
 Feature Prize: Mark Irving, The West Australian
 Resources Prize: Jane Stinson, ABC TV
 Health & Medical News: John Flint, The Sunday Times
 Health & Medical Feature: Joe Spagnolo, South West Times
 Feature Photography: John Mokrzycki
 News Photography: John Mokrzycki
 Travel Report: Mark Irving, The West Australian
 Tourism Prize: Liam Phillips, The West Australian
 Sub-Editing Prize: Sheryl-lee Kerr, The Sunday Times
 Print Graphics: Emma Thompson, The West Australian
 Print News: Steve Butler and Ben Martin, The West Australian
 Perth Press Club Country Prize: Joe Spagnolo, South West Times
 Perth Press Club Suburban Prize: George Williams, Post Newspapers
 Perth Press Club Prize: Steve Butler, The West Australian
 Lovekin Prize: Bret Christian, Post Newspapers
 Clarion Award: Martin Turner
 Daily News Centenary Prize: Sean Cowan and Philip Cornford, The West Australian

2005 winners
 A.H. Kornweibel Arts Prize: Liam  Phillips, The West Australian
 Daily News Centenary Prize: Liam Bartlett, ABC Radio Perth
 Print News Prize: Paige Taylor, The Australian
 Print Graphics Prize: Greg Smith, The Sunday Times
 News Photography Prize: Greg Burke, The West Australian
 Feature Photography Prize: Nic Ellis, The West Australian
 Sub-Editing Prize: David Cusworth, The West Australian
 Country Prize: Kim Daly, The Albany Advertiser
 Suburban Prize: Pamela Medlen, Community Newspaper Group
 TV Prize: Grant Taylor, Channel 9
 Broadcast Graphics Prize: Gavin Smith, Channel 10
 TV Camera Prize: Tim Cohen, Channel 7
 Radio Prize: Liam Bartlett, ABC Radio Perth
 Feature Prize: Rochelle Mutton, The Weekend Australian.
 Health and Medical Feature Prize: Paige Taylor and Adam Cresswell, The Australian
 Tourism Prize: Griffin Longley, The West Australian
 Resources Prize: Nigel Wilson, The Australian
 Health and Medical News Prize: John Flint, The Sunday Times
 Business News Prize: Sean Cowan & Luke Eliot, The West Australian
 Travel Report: Steve Pennells, The West Australian
 Sports Prize: Nick Taylor, The Sunday Times
 Best Newcomer Prize: Marsha Jacobs, WA Business News
 Clarion Prize: Victoria Laurie
 Student Prize: Robert Scott, Murdoch University
 Arthur Lovekin Prize: Steve Pennells, The West Australian

2006 winners
 Best Newcomer Prize: Rhianna King, The West Australian
 Print Graphics Prize: Greg Smith, The Sunday Times
 Travel Prize: Jodi Monaghan, Pilbara News 
 Sports Prize: Jonathan Cook, The West Australian 
 Business Prize: Andrew Burrell, Australian Financial Review 
 Feature Photography Prize: Astrid Volzke, The West Australian
 News Photography Prize: Lee Griffith, The West Australian
 Political Reporting Prize: Jessica Strutt, The West Australian
 Print News Prize: Colleen Egan, The Sunday Times
 Tourism Prize: Clint Wheeldon, ABC TV 
 Resources Prize: Jessica Strutt, The West Australian
 Feature Prize: David de Vos, ABC TV
 Health and Medical Feature Prize: Marnie McKimmie, The West Australian
 Health and Medical News Prize: John Flint, The Sunday Times 
 Consumer Affairs Prize: John Flint, The Sunday Times
 Sub-Editing Prize: George Williams, Post Newspapers 
 Country Prize: Kym Daly, The Kalgoorlie Miner 
 Suburban Prize: Beatrice Thomas, Community Newspapers
 TV Prize: Mara Pritchard, Channel 7
 TV Camera Prize: not awarded
 Radio Prize: Peter Kapsanis, ABC Radio
 Student Prize: Stephanie Painter, Murdoch University.
 A.H. Kornweibel Arts Prize: Griffin Longley, The West Australian 
 Clarion Award: Nick Way
 Daily News Centenary Prize: Colleen Egan

2007 winners 
 Best Newcomer Prize: Emmy Kubainski, ABC News
 Print Graphics Prize: Greg Smith, The Sunday Times
 Travel Prize: Robert Taylor, The West Australian
 Sports Prize: Paige Taylor & Tony Barrass, The Australian
 Business Prize: Paige Taylor & Tony Barrass, The Australian
 Feature Photography Prize: Paul McGovern, Post Newspapers 
 News Photography Prize: Jody D'Arcy, The Sunday Times
 Political Reporting Prize: Andrew Probyn, The West Australian
 Print News Prize: Paige Taylor and Cath Hart, The Australian
 Tourism Prize: Griffin Longley, The West Australian
 Resources Prize: Nigel Wilson, The Australian
 Feature Prize: Mara Fox, The Sunday Times
 Electronic Feature: David de Vos, ABC TV
 Health and Medical Feature Prize: Elvira Nuic, ABC TV's Stateline
 Health and Medical News Prize: John Flint, The Sunday Times
 Consumer Affairs Prize: Joe Spagnolo, The Sunday Times
 Sub-Editing Prize: Stephen Fox, The Sunday Times
 Country Prize: Phillipa Prior, The Kalgoorlie Miner
 Suburban Prize: Mark McCrory, Community Newspaper Group
 TV Prize: Gary Adshead, Channel 7
 TV Camera Prize: James Hayward, Channel 7
 Broadcast Graphics Prize: Kym Cohen, ABC TV
 Radio Prize: David Weber, ABC Radio
 Student Prize: Jayde Little, WA Academy of Performing Arts
 A.H. Kornweibel Arts Prize: Leonie Harris, ABC TV's Stateline
 Arthur Lovekin Prize in Journalism: Steve Pennells, The West Australian
 Clarion Award: Joseph Fernandez
 Daily News Centenary Prize: Paige Taylor and Cath Hart, The Australian

2008 winners
 Best Newcomer Prize: Yasmine Phillips, The West Australian:
 Online Reporting Prize: Colleen Egan, Perth Now
 Science Prize: Leonie Harris, ABC TV
 Print Graphics Prize: Greg Smith, The Sunday Times
 Travel Prize: Narelle Towie, The Sunday Times
 Sports Prize: Paige Taylor, The Australian
 Business Prize: Sean Cowan and Gary Adshead, The West Australian
 Feature Photography Prize: Andrew Ritchie, Western Suburbs Weekly
 News Photography Prize: Guy Magowan, The West Australian
 Political Reporting Prize: Paul Lampathakis and Joe Spagnolo, The Sunday Times
 Tourism Prize: Bill Rule, The Sunday Times
 Print News Prize: Jessica Strutt, The West Australian
 Resources Prize: Ronan O'Connell and Sean Cowan, The West Australian
 Feature Prize: Gary Adshead, The West Australian
 Electronic Feature: Christien de Garis, ABC TV
 Health and Medical Feature Prize: Victoria Laurie, The Australian 
 Health and Medical News Prize: Paul Lampathakis, The Sunday Times
 Consumer Affairs Prize: Simon Beaumont, 6PR
 Sub-Editing Prize: Sheryl-Lee Kerr, The Sunday Times
 Country Prize: Not awarded
 Suburban Prize: George Williams, POST Newspapers
 TV Prize: Amanda Paterson and Amelia Ballinger, A Current Affair
 TV Camera Prize: Nikki Holmes, A Current Affair
 Broadcast Graphics Prize: Kym Cohen, ABC TV
 Radio Prize: David Weber, ABC
 Student Prize: Dominique Pratt, Edith Cowan University
 A.H. Kornweibel Arts Prize: David de Vos, ABC TV
 Arthur Lovekin Prize: George Williams, POST Newspapers
 Clarion Award: Colleen Egan
 Daily News Centenary Prize: George Williams, POST Newspapers

2009 winners
 Best Newcomer Prize: Jolleh Abshar, Channel 9/A Current Affair
 Online Reporting Prize: Sharon Kennedy, ABC Southwest
 Science Prize: Flip Prior, The West Australian.
 Print Graphics Prize: Dean Alston, The West Australian
 Sports Prize: Billy Rule, The Sunday Times 
 Business Prize: Andrew Burrell, The Australian Financial Review
 News Photography Prize: Kerris Berrington, The Sunday Times
 Feature Photography Prize: Frances Andrijich, The West Magazine/The West Australian; Karin Calvert-Borshoff, STM/The Sunday Times
 Political Reporting Prize: Paul Lampathakis, The Sunday Times
 Print News Prize: Paige Taylor, The Australian
 Travel Prize: Matt Tinney, Channel 9
 Resources Prize: Sean Cowan, The West Australian
 Print Feature Prize: Steve Pennells, The West Australian
 Electronic Feature: Dixie Marshall and Michelle Lord, Channel 9's A Current Affair
 Health and Medical Feature Prize: Lara Ladyman, The Countryman
 Health and Medical News Prize: Paul Lampathakis, The Sunday Times
 Consumer Affairs Prize: Sean Cowan and Gary Adshead, The West Australian
 Sub-Editing Prize: David Cusworth, The West Australian
 Country Prize: Nathan Dyer, Kimberley Echo
 Suburban Prize: Linda Callaghan, POST Newspapers
 TV Prize: Rochelle Mutton, Channel 9
 TV Camera Prize: Gayle Adams, Channel 7/Today Tonight
 Radio Prize: David Weber, ABC Radio; and Geoff Hutchison, ABC 720 Perth
 Student Prize: Jamie Burnett, WA Academy of Performing Arts
 A.H. Kornweibel Arts Prize: Nikki Wilson-Smith: ABC TV Stateline
 Arthur Lovekin Prize: Gary Adshead, The West Australian
 Daily News Centenary Prize: Sean Cowan and Gary Adshead, The West Australian

2010 winners
 Daily News Centenary Award: Gary Adshead & Sean Cowan, The West Australian
 Arthur Lovekin Prize: Paige Taylor, The Australian, and Gary Adshead & Sean Cowan, The West Australian
 Arts: Claire Nichols, ABC TV
 Best Newcomer Prize: Phoebe Wearne, Albany Advertiser
 Business: Paul Lampathakis, The Sunday Times
 Cartoon: Greg Smith, The Sunday Times
 Clarion: Tony Barrass 
 Columnist: Sarah Quinton, The West Australian
 Consumer Affairs: Caro Meldrum-Hanna, Sarah Ferguson & Michael Doyle, ABC TV's Four Corners
 Electronic Feature: Nikki Wilson-Smith, ABC TV
 Environment: Linda Callaghan, Post Newspapers
 Feature Photography: Theo Fakos The Sunday Times
 Health Feature: Cathy O'Leary, The West Australian
 Health News: Paul Lampathakis, The Sunday Times
 News Photography: Michael Wilson, The West Australian 
 Online: Nick Butterly, Lee Griffith & Adam Vou, WA Newspapers
 Politics: Paul Lampathakis, The Sunday Times 
 Print Feature: Gary Adshead & Sean Cowan, The West Australian
 Print News: Paige Taylor, The Australian
 Radio: Damian Rabbitt, ABC Radio 720 Perth
 Regional: Nick Sas Albany Advertiser:
 Resources: Frances Pratt, Kalgoorlie Miner
 Sport: Glen Foreman, The Sunday Times
 Student: Damian Smith, WAAPA
 Sub-editing: Paul Barry, The West Australian
 Suburban: Liam Croy, Community Newspaper Group
 TV Camera: Peter Lettenmaier, Channel 7
 TV News: Channel Seven News team entry

2011 winners
 Daily News Centenary Award: Steve Pennells, The West Australian
 Arthur Lovekin Prize: Angela Pownall, Cathy O'Leary, Marnie McKimmie, The West Australian
 Arts: Claire Nichols, ABC
 Best Newcomer: Emma Sheridan, GWN
 Business: Jonathan Barrett and Peter Kerr, Australian Financial Review
 Cartoon: Greg Smith, The Sunday Times
 Clarion: David Cohen, POST Newspapers
 Columnist: Joe Spagnolo, Sunday Times
 Environment: David Cohen, POST Newspapers
 Feature Photography: Steve Pennells, The West Australian
 Health: Marnie McKimmie and Cathy O'Leary, The West Australian
 Indigenous Affairs: Nicole Cox, The Sunday Times
 News Photography: Michael Wilson, The West Australian
 Online: Christopher Manly, The West Australian
 Politics: Sean Cowan and Beatrice Thomas, The West Australian
 Print Feature: Steve Pennells, The West Australian 
 Print News: Steve Pennells, The West Australian
 Radio News: Damian Rabbitt, ABC
 Radio Current Affairs: David Weber, ABC
 Regional: Rania Spooner, The Kalgoorlie Miner
 Science: Nikki Wilson-Smith, ABC
 Social Equity Report: Steve Pennells, The West Australian
 Sport: Sean Cowan, The West Australian
 Student:  Alex Soares, Murdoch University
 Sub-editing: Paul Barry, The West Australian
 Suburban: Linda Callaghan, Bret Christian and Lloyd Gorman, POST Newspapers
 TV Camera: Trent Nind, Channel Seven
 TV Current Affairs: Jake Sturmer, ABC
 TV News: Seven News Team, Channel Seven

2012 winners
 Daily News Centenary Award: Anthony DeCeglie, The Sunday Times
 Arthur Lovekin Prize: Paige Taylor, The Australian
 Arts: Nick Way, Channel Ten
 Best Newcomer: Emma Sheridan, Emma Young, Community Newspapers
 Business: Steve Pennells, The West Australian
 Cartoon: Greg Smith, The Sunday Times
 Clarion: Steve Pennells, The West Australian
 Columnist: Andrew Probyn, The West Australian
 Environment: Narelle Towie, The Sunday Times
 Feature Photography: Lee Griffith, The West Australian
 Health: Anthony DeCeglie, The Sunday Times
 Indigenous Affairs: Yasmine Phillips, The Sunday Times
 News Photography: Daniel Wilkins, The Sunday Times
 Online: Katherine Fleming, Kate Ferguson, Adam Vou, Alex Noor and Christopher Manly, thewest.com.au
 Politics: Gary Adshead, The West Australian
 Print Feature: Joseph Catanzaro, The West Australian 
 Print News: Anthony DeCeglie, The Sunday Times
 Radio News: Meri Fatin, Nadia Mitsopoulos and Geoff Hutchison, ABC
 Regional: Emma Sheridan, GWN7 News
 Science: Narelle Towie, ABC
 Social Equity Report: Steve Pennells, The West Australian
 Sport: Glen Foreman, The Sunday Times
 Student:  Clint Jasper, Curtin University
 Sub-editing: David Cusworth, The Sunday Times
 Suburban: Kaitlyn Offer, Midland Kalamunda Reporter & Lloyd Gorman, POST Newspapers
 TV Camera: Gayle Adams, Channel Seven
 TV Current Affairs: Jake Sturmer, ABC
 TV News: Grant Taylor, Channel Seven

2013 winners
 The Daily News Centenary Prize: Kirsti Melville and Meri Fatin
 The Clarion Award: Tony Malkovic
 Best Print/Text News Report: Luke Eliot, Gary Adshead, Amanda Banks, Rhianna King and Gabrielle Knowles, The West Australian
 Best Print /Text Feature Writing: Steve Pennells, The West Australia
 Best Three Headlines: David Cusworth, The Sunday Times
 Suburban – Best Three Stories or Feature: Anne Gartner, Community Newspaper Group
 Best News Photograph: Colin Murty, The Australian
 Best Feature Photographic Essay: Steve Pennells, The West Australian
 Television/Audio-Visual Journalism – Best News Story or Feature: Steve Pennells, Paul Walker and Richard Cunningham; Seven Network
 Radio/Audio Journalism - Best News Story or Feature: Kirsti Melville and Meri Fatin, 360documentaries, ABC Radio National
 Best Multi-Media Report or Series: Jerrie Demasi, WAtoday.com.au (Fairfax)
 Best Broadcast Camerawork: Carl Nelson, Network Ten
 Best Political Report: Andrew Probyn, The West Australian
 Best Health/Medical Report: Cathy O'Leary, The West Australian
 Best Science and Environmental Report: David Weber, ABC Radio, TV news and online
 Business, Economics or Finance Report: Nick Evans, The West Australian
 Best Sports Report: Steve Butler, The West Australian
 Best Social Equity Report: Steve Pennells, The West Australian
 Regional and Community – Best Three News Stories or Features: James Purtill, The West Australian and The Kalgoorlie Miner
 Best Culture and Arts Report: Kristy Symonds, The Sunday Times and Perth Now
 Best Columnist - The Matt Price Award: Jonathan Barrett, The Australian Financial Review and AFR online
 Best New Journalist or Cadet: Rachel Cary, GWN7 News
 Outstanding Journalism Student Award: Syan Dougherty, Edith Cowan University
 Arthur Lovekin Prize: Steve Pennells, The West Australian

2014 winners 
 2014 Daily News Centenary Prize: Jonathan Barrett, Fairfax Media
 The Clarion Award: Neale Prior
 The Arthur Lovekin Prize for Excellence in Journalism: John Flint, The Sunday Times
 Best Print/Text News Report: Cathy Saunders and Martin Saxon, The Sunday Times
 Best Print/Text Feature Writing: Jonathan Barrett, AFR Weekend
 Best Three Headlines: David Cusworth, POST Newspapers
 Suburban – Best 3 News Features Print/Online: Emma Young, Comment News
 Best Cartoon, Illustration or Graphic: Greg Smith, The Sunday Times
 TV/Audio-Visual Journalism - Best News Story or Feature: Caitlyn Gribbin, ABC Television 7.30, "Who is Doctor Nitschke advising?"
 Best Broadcast Camerawork: Carl Nelson, Network Ten Perth
 Radio/Audio Journalism – Radio News Story or Feature: Caitlyn Gribbin, PM, ABC Local Radio
 Best News Photograph: Sharon Smith, The West Australian, "The Shark Cull Begins"
 Best News Photograph – Suburban: Jon Hewson, Community Newspaper Group
 Best Feature Photographic Essay: Steve Pennells, The West Australian
 Best Multi Media Report or Series: Narelle Towie and Pippa Doyle, WAToday
 A.H Kornweibel Prize for Best Culture & Arts Report: Victoria Laurie, The Australian Review Section
 Business Economics or Finance Report: Jonathan Barrett, AFR Weekend
 Best Political Report: Geof Parry, Seven News Perth
 Matt Price Award for Best Columnist: Andrew Probyn, The West Australian
 Social Equity Report: Jonathan Barrett, AFR Weekend
 Best Science and Environmental Report: John Flint, The Sunday Times
 Best Freelance Journalist: Kerry Faulkner, RM Williams Outback Magazine
 Best Health/Medical Report: Caitlyn Gribbin, ABC Television 7.30
 Regional & Community: Best 3 News Features (70km): Michael Dulaney, Kalgoorlie Miner
 Outstanding Journalism Student: Kyle Brown, Edith Cowan University
 Best New Journalist or Cadet: Chenee Marrapodi, WA Today.com.au
 Best Sports Report: Steve Butler, The West Australian

2016 winners

 2016 Daily News Centenary Prize: Andrew Probyn, The West Australian
 The Clarion Award: Nick Evans, The West Australian
 The Arthur Lovekin Prize for Excellence in Journalism: David Cohen, The Post
 Best Print/Text News Report: Andrew Probyn, The West Australian
 Best Print/Text Feature Writing: Andrew Burrell, The Weekend Australian
Best Three Headlines: Martin Saxon, The Sunday Times STM Magazine
 Suburban – Best 3 News Features Print/Online: Sarah Brookes, Echo Newspaper
 TV/Audio-Visual Journalism - Best News Story or Feature: Jessica Page, Seven News.
 Best Broadcast Camerawork: Cameron Wallis, Seven News
 Radio/Audio Journalism – Radio News Story or Feature: Lauren Day, ABC
 Best News Photograph: Marta Pascual Juanola, Mandurah Mail
 Best News Photograph – Community/Regional: Jon Gellweiler, Ampersand Southwest Magazine 
 Best Feature Photographic Essay: Coilin Murty, The Australian
Online: Simon White, Emma Young, Tim Carrier, Heather McNeil and David Baker, WAtoday 
 A.H Kornweibel Prize for Best Culture & Arts Report: Victoria Laurie, The Weekend Australian
 Business Economics or Finance Report: Courtney Bembridge, ABC
 Best Political Report: Andrew Probyn, The West Australian / Rebecca Turner & Jessica Strutt, ABC
 Matt Price Award for Best Columnist: Liam Bartlett, The Sunday Times
 Social Equity Report: Paige Taylor & Victoria Laurie, The Weekend Australian
 Best Science and Environmental Report: Emma Young, WAtoday
 Best Freelance Journalist: Kerry Faulkner
 Best Health/Medical Report: Emma Young, WAtoday
 Regional & Community: Best 3 News Features (70km): Nathan Morris, ABC
 Outstanding Journalism Student: Thomas de Souza, Edith Cowan University
Best New Journalist or Cadet: Nathan Hondros, Mandurah Mail
 Best Sports Report: John Townsend, The West Australian

References

Scoop (journalism magazine), vol. 18 no. 3 (Spring 2007), pp 13–16
Scoop (journalism magazine), vol. 19 no. 4 (Summer 2008), pp 10–13
 http://www.wamediaawards.com.au/2011-winners
 http://www.wamediaawards.com.au/winners-and-finalists-2012

Australian journalism awards
Mass media in Western Australia